Banjska is a village located in Zvečan in northern Kosovo. It has a population of 465 inhabitants as of 2011.

Places of interest
The Banjska monastery is nearby.

Events
In 1999 a RTV transmitter was damaged.

During the Kosovan parliamentary election, 2010, a polling station was surrounded by an  angry mob and access to the village was blocked.

Notes and references
Notes

References

Villages in Zvečan
Zvečan
Medieval Serbian sites in Kosovo